East Perth railway station is located on the Midland line and Airport line in Perth, Western Australia. It is operated by Transperth serving the suburb of East Perth. It is adjacent to the East Perth Terminal and Public Transport Centre.

History
The site occupied by East Perth station, East Perth Terminal and the Public Transport Centre was formerly the East Perth Locomotive Depot.

The station took the name of the previous East Perth station, which was renamed Claisebrook. The former East Perth railway station was removed on the change of the railway system in the late 1960s.

The original East Perth railway station opened in 1883, and in the early 20th century was found the name East Perth Junction (the junction being the line that proceeded to Armadale and joined the Eastern Railway close to the station). It was renamed Claisebrook in 1969.

As part of the Perth Stadium transport works, the station was upgraded over a two-year period from 2016 to 2018. Due to the large numbers expected to utilise the station on event days, an upgrade was required to ensure that the station could handle the large crowds, as well as to make it fully accessible. Works included lengthening platforms and associated shelters to handle four to six car trains, upgrading and expanding lifts, staircases and walkways, and expanding car and bike parking spaces. In addition, platforms were resurfaced, tactile markings were added and four new lifts were installed to make the station fully compliant with disability access standards.

Platforms

East Perth railway station is served by the Midland line on the Transperth network. This line goes between Midland railway station and Perth railway station. It will be served by the Airport line when that opens on 9 October 2022. The airport line will go between High Wycombe railway station and Claremont railway station. It will also be served by the Morley–Ellenbrook line when that opens  Services on that line will go between Ellenbrook railway station and Perth railway station. Midland line trains stop at the station every 10 minutes during peak on weekdays, and every 15 minutes during the day outside peak every day of the year except Christmas Day. Trains are half-hourly or hourly at night time. The station saw 200,284 passengers in the 2013-14 financial year.

The long, approximately  platform to the west of platforms 1 and 2 is the East Perth Terminal platform. It is served by regional and interstate trains.

Bus routes
Transperth services

Coach routes
Transwa coach services, departing East Perth Terminal

References

East Perth, Western Australia
Midland line, Perth
Railway stations in Perth, Western Australia
Railway stations in Australia opened in 1969
Airport line, Perth